The following are lists of people executed in the United States.

By state

 List of people executed in Alabama
 List of people executed in Arizona
 List of people executed in Arkansas
 List of people executed in California
 List of people executed in Colorado
 List of people executed in Connecticut
 List of people executed in Delaware
 List of people executed by the District of Columbia
 List of people executed in Florida
 List of people executed in Georgia
 List of people executed in Idaho
 List of people executed in Illinois
 List of people executed in Indiana
 List of people executed in Iowa
 List of people executed in Kansas
 List of people executed in Kentucky
 List of people executed in Louisiana
 List of people executed in Maine
 List of people executed in Maryland
 List of people executed in Massachusetts
 List of people executed in Michigan
 List of people executed in Mississippi
 List of people executed in Missouri
 List of people executed in Montana
 List of people executed in Nebraska
 List of people executed in Nevada
 List of people executed in New Hampshire
 List of people executed in New Jersey
 List of people executed in New Mexico
 List of people executed in New York
 List of people executed in North Carolina
 List of people executed in North Dakota
 List of people executed in Ohio
 List of people executed in Oklahoma
 List of people executed in Oregon
 List of people executed in Pennsylvania
 List of people executed in Rhode Island
 List of people executed in South Carolina
 List of people executed in South Dakota
 List of people executed in Tennessee
 Lists of people executed in Texas
 List of people executed in Utah
 List of people executed in Vermont
 List of people executed in Virginia
 List of people executed in Washington
 List of people executed in West Virginia
 List of people executed in Wisconsin
 List of people executed in Wyoming

By year

 List of people executed in the United States in 2000
 List of people executed in the United States in 2001
 List of people executed in the United States in 2002
 List of people executed in the United States in 2003
 List of people executed in the United States in 2004
 List of people executed in the United States in 2005
 List of people executed in the United States in 2006
 List of people executed in the United States in 2007
 List of people executed in the United States in 2008
 List of people executed in the United States in 2009
 List of people executed in the United States in 2010
 List of people executed in the United States in 2011
 List of people executed in the United States in 2012
 List of people executed in the United States in 2013
 List of people executed in the United States in 2014
 List of people executed in the United States in 2015
 List of people executed in the United States in 2016
 List of people executed in the United States in 2017
 List of people executed in the United States in 2018
 List of people executed in the United States in 2019
 List of people executed in the United States in 2020
 List of people executed in the United States in 2021
 List of people executed in the United States in 2022
 List of people executed in the United States in 2023

Other
 List of people executed by the United States federal government
 List of people executed by the United States military
 List of most recent executions by jurisdiction § United States
 List of juveniles executed in the United States since 1976
 List of women executed in the United States since 1976

See also
 List of executions in Japan